Prakash Varma is an Indian filmmaker who has directed and produced many popular advertisement campaigns including the iconic Vodafone commercials featuring ZooZoos. He comes from a Malayali family. Varma heads Nirvana Films, Indian production houses of television commercials.  

In September 2009, Varma was signed by Michael Bay's advertisement film production house, The Institute.  to direct commercials for them.

References

Living people
Indian filmmakers
Year of birth missing (living people)